Liss Riverside Railway Walk South is a   Local Nature Reserve in Liss in Hampshire. It is owned and managed by Liss Parish Council.

This footpath through woodland is the southern continuation of  Liss Riverside Railway Walk North, following  the route of the former Longmoor Military Railway.

References

Local Nature Reserves in Hampshire